Marjory Cobbe of Devon, England was a midwife. In 1469 she was granted an annual pension of £10 for her attendance on Elizabeth Woodville, wife of Edward IV.

References

English midwives
15th-century English people
Year of birth unknown
Year of death unknown
15th-century English women